Corinne Chevallier (born 25 June 1935) is an Algerian historian and novelist of pied noir descent. Her father, Jacques Chevallier, was mayor of Algiers.

Life
She was born in Algiers in 1935, where she has lived ever since.

She is one of the few pieds noirs who took Algerian citizenship and remained in the new state.

Works
Her works include the novels 
La Petite Fille du Tassili (Algiers: Éditions Casbah, 2001) and  La Nuit du corsaire (Algiers: Éditions Casbah, 2005)

References 

1935 births
Living people
People from Algiers
Pieds-Noirs
Algerian historians
Algerian people of French descent
Women historians
Algerian women writers
Algerian writers